The Jogorku Kenesh of the Republic of Kyrgyzstan of the 7th convocation is the current convocation of the Parliament of the Republic of Kyrgyzstan, elected in the 2021 parliamentary election.

History 
On 29 December 2021, the new convocation officially began work. Talant Mamytov was re-elected Speaker of the Supreme Council.

On the same day, the deputy group "Eldik" was created by 13 single-mandate deputies.

On 5 October 2022 Talant Mamytov resigned, and Nurlanbek Shakiev was elected as the new speaker.

On 6 October 2022, the parliamentary group "Mekenchil" was created from single-mandate deputies who broke away from the group "Ata-Jurt Kyrgyzstan".

Current composition

References 

Supreme Council of Kyrgyzstan
Politics of Kyrgyzstan
2021 establishments